Schriever station is a train station in Schriever, Louisiana, United States served by Amtrak, the national railroad passenger system. The station was originally built by the Texas and New Orleans Railroad. Today it is also the Burlington Northern and Santa Fe Gulf Division office.

References

External links

Schriever Amtrak Station (USA Rail Guide -- TrainWeb.org)

Amtrak stations in Louisiana
Railway stations in the United States opened in 1975